Gasan Nadzhafov (ru)
 Ruslan Nalgiev (ru)
 Sergey Natochy (ru)
 Yuri Naumov (ru)
 Yuri Nedviga (ru)
 Vladimir Nedobezhkin (ru)
 Pavel Nemtsov (ru)
 Mikhail Nemytkin (ru)
 Andrey Nepryakhin (ru)
 Igor Nerestyuk (ru)
 Yuri Nesterenko (ru)
 Vitaly Netyksa (ru)
 Sergey Nefyodov (ru)
 Vitaly Neff (ru)
 Ivan Nechaev (ru)
 Yuri Nikitich (ru)
 Aleksandr Nikishin (ru)
 Dmitry Nikishin (ru)
 Aleksandr Nikulin (ru)
 Aleksey Novikov (ru)
 Vasily Novikov (ru)
 Oleg Novitsky
 Dmitry Novosyolov (ru)
 Yevgeny Novosyolov (ru)
 Sergey Novokhatsky (ru)
 Viktor Nosov
 Vasily Nuzhny (ru)
 Magomed Nurbagandov (ru)
 Vladimir Nurgaliev (ru)

References 
 

Heroes N